Margret Holmes Bates (Martha Mary Victoria Ernsperger; October 6, 1844 – January 21, 1927) was an American author better known by her pen names, Mrs M E Holmes, Margret Holmes, Margret Holmes Bates, and Margaret Holmes Bates. Her first publication was entitled, Manitou, the plot of which centered around Rochester, Indiana and Indianapolis, Indiana. One of her most noted books, Hildegarde, was a poetry collection, dedicated to her son, Charles.

Early life and education
Martha Mary Victoria Ernsperger was born in Fremont, Ohio, October 6, 1844. Her maiden name was Ernsperger, and after five generations on U.S. soil, the name preserves its original spelling and pronunciation. She was a daughter of Christopher, a farmer, and Julia (Ensminger) Ernsperger. Bates' father was born in Baltimore, Maryland. He went with his father's family some time after he had attained his majority and settled in northern Ohio. From Ohio, he removed to Rochester, Indiana, in the fall of 1858. The mother's family, as purely German as the father's, were Pennsylvanians. As a family, they were scholarly and polished, running to professions, notably those of law and theology.

In Bates' childhood, she showed great fondness for books, and as a school-girl, the weekly or fortnightly "composition" was to her a pleasant past-time, a respite from the duller, more prosaic studies of mathematics and the rules of grammar. It was her delight to be allowed, when out of school, to put her fancies into form in writing, or to sit surrounded by her young sisters and baby brother and tell them stories as she thought of them.

Bates spent her girlhood days in Rochester, and was educated in the public schools of Ohio.

Career
Bates taught school in Rochester for many years.

In June 1865, she married Charles Austin Bates, a businessman, of Medina, New York, and since that time, her home has been in Indianapolis, Indiana. Fascinated for several years after her marriage with the idea of becoming a model housekeeper, and conscientious to a painful degree in the discharge of her duties as a mother, she wrote nothing for publication, and but little, even at the solicitations of friends, for special occasions. This way of life, unnatural for her, proved unhealthful.

Some of her poems attracted wide attention. The poem, "Nineveh", was an epitome of her life. One of her most noted books, Hildegarde, was a poetry collection, dedicated to her son, Charles.

Her first novel, Manitou (1881), was written at the request of her son. It embodies a legend connected with the lake of that name in northern Indiana, in the vicinity of which Bates lived for several years before her marriage. The Chamber Over the Gate (Indianapolis, 1886) had a wide sale. Other books included, The price of the Ring (1892), Shylock's Daughter (1894), Jasper Fairfax (1897), In the First Degree (1907), Hildegarde and Other Lyrics (1911), and Browning Critiques (1927).Shylock's Daughter (1894).

In addition to poetry and novels, she wrote short stories, business articles, book reviews, and school primers. When good health seemed to evade her, she turned to writing for pastime and wrote much for newspapers and periodicals. She was the editor-in-chief of Tatler, a monthly magazine established in Indianapolis in 1887. 

Bates served on the Executive Committee of the Western Association of Writers, before removing to New York City in 1894. She was a charter member of the Browning Society of New York and an honorary member of the Indiana Society of New York. She was also a member of Daughters of Ohio in New York, Daughters of Indiana in New York, and the Playgoers Club. In religion, she was Episcopalian. Bates favored women's suffrage.

Death
After three days of illness, Margret Holmes Bates died of heart disease at her home in New York City, January 21, 1927.

Selected works

Books

As Margret Holmes
 Manitou (Indianapolis : Carlon & Hollenbeck, Printers and Binders, 1881) 
 The Chamber over the Gate (Indianapolis : C.A. Bates, 1886) 
 Her fatal sin (Chicago : Laird & Lee, 1886)
 A Heartless Woman; Or, Love and Deceit (Chicago : Laird & Lee, 1886)
 The Tragedy of Redmount (Chicago : Laird & Lee, 1886)
 Dialogues for Christmas (Indianapolis : Charles A. Bates, 1887)
 Recitations for Christmas (New York : The De Witt Publishing House, 1887)
 Little dialogues for little people (New York : De Witt publishing house, 1889)
 Select dialogues for young people (Chicago : Donohue, Henneberry, 1891)
 The price of the Ring (Chicago : F.J. Schulte & Co., 1892)
 Shylock's Daughter (Chicago : C.H. Kerr, 1894) 
 Jasper Fairfax,  (New York : R. F. Fenno, 1897)

As Margret Holmes Bates
 Silas Kirkendown's sons (Artwork by R. Stebbins; Boston : The C.M. Clark Publishing Co.  1908)
 Paying the Piper (New York : Broadway Publishing Co., 1910)
 Select readings and recitations for all the year round : Labor Day, Thanksgiving Day, Christmas and New Year, Washington's Birthday, Easter, Memorial Day (Lebanon, Ohio : March Bros., 1914)
 Browning critiques (Chicago : The Morris Book Shop , 1921)

As Margaret Holmes Bates
 In the First Degree (New York, R.G. Cooke, Inc., 1907)

Poetry
 "My Indian Basket"
 "Nineveh"

Gallery

Notes

References

Attribution

Bibliography

External links
 
 
 Works by or about Margaret Holmes Ernsperger Bates at HathiTrust

1844 births
1927 deaths
19th-century pseudonymous writers
20th-century pseudonymous writers
19th-century American novelists
19th-century American short story writers
19th-century American poets
19th-century American non-fiction writers
20th-century American novelists
20th-century American short story writers
20th-century American poets
20th-century American non-fiction writers
Pseudonymous women writers
Writers from Ohio
People from Fremont, Ohio
American magazine editors
American women novelists
American women poets
Wikipedia articles incorporating text from A Woman of the Century